John C. Goss (born October 21, 1958, in Landstuhl, Germany) is an American artist and author and has lived most of his life in the Asia/Pacific region (Hawaii, California, Thailand).

Education and early career
He received his MFA from California Institute of the Arts in 1984 and his BFA summa cum laude from Northern Illinois University in 1981. He also studied at the University of California, San Diego from 1981-1982. In 1989 he received a National Endowment for the Arts fellowship and was nominated for the Herb Alpert Award in the Arts in 1998.

His video and photographic works have been exhibited around the world, including the Whitney Museum of American Art, the American Film Institute, Hirschorn Museum, the Berlin Film Festival, Pacific Film Archive, Walker Arts Center, San Francisco Museum of Modern Art, Hong Kong Arts Centre, International Center of Photography, The National Gallery of Canada, Massachusetts Institute of Technology, Institut d'Estudis Nord-Americans Barcelona, Museum of Fine Arts Boston, Harvard and Yale universities. Reviews of his work have appeared in October, Camera Obscura, Jump Cut, Artweek, Afterimage, and the New Art Examiner.

An early innovator in computer art, he created queer selfies using the Apple II in the late 70s and the first gay-themed hyper text novel, Devil's Lava Lamp Now, in 1992 on the Amiga. Some of those early experimental self-portraits from the video, Digital Reflections (a collaboration with Frank Deitrich and Deborah Gorchos), were exhibited at the Computer Culture Art Show at SIGGRAPH 1981.

In 1989, Goss collaborated with artists' Alan Pulner and Richard Zvonar to create Rapture Stations in the Virtual Funhouse, an interactive, computer-manipulated environment, at the Santa Monica Museum of Art. Described as a hyper-media theater machine, Goss conceptualized an innovative HyperCard "A.I. Ringmaster" that manipulated the exhibition in real time. Providing a controllable degree of randomness, the software could generate new theatrical scenes by scrambling existing text. It also generated an ever-changing environment, controlling on/off and fade levels for lighting, slide projectors, toys, MIDI sound settings, and everyday appliances. The soundscape used live samples of performers, messages phoned into the museum, and a record player available for use by the audience. Artists were invited to remotely contribute art and text which descended in from the museum's Fax machine hung from the ceiling.

In 1990, Goss staged his performance work, Forbidden Planet, at Highways in Santa Monica, CA, on Jan 25, 26, 27, and Feb 3, 4. The multi-media theatrical presentation examined sex and intimacy in the age of AIDS and telecommunications. Altaira Morbius, lead character from the sci-fi classic, Forbidden Planet, resumes her story after arriving on Earth in the midst of an epidemic and social upheaval. With cameos from Calvin Klein, Perry Ellis, Michael Jackson and Jesus (come again, now a Latino patient in a hospital's AIDS ward), Altaira decides that uptight Earth is the real forbidden planet and re-uses parts from her robot to create a global phone sex network to heal the planet.

Special Effects Design
As a designer Goss created concert tour effects for Neil Diamond, George Michael, Deep Purple and Rush; theme park effects for Disney World and Disneyland; large-scale multi-media features for Caesars Palace and Luxor Hotel in Las Vegas; and special effects for international Expo pavilions (1986, 1988 and 1993).

Activism
In the late 1980s/early 1990s Goss was a member of a Los Angeles-based collective of anonymous artists who created visual and performance components for various ACT UP Los Angeles demonstrations and HIV/AIDS awareness events in Los Angeles, Ohio, and Chicago. The collective changed names for each action and was variously known as The Tribe, The Altered Boys, Stiff Sheets, Bad Seed, and Fags in Flags.

In 1992 he produced a documentary and music video on AIDS/HIV educational efforts in Bangkok, Thailand.

In 1994, Goss and partners opened Southeast Asia's first gay and lesbian center, Utopia, in Bangkok. In 1995 he created the online Utopia, the Internet's first Asian gay and lesbian resource portal.

Later career
His photographs appeared in the landmark pop cultural book, Very Thai (River Books Press Dist A C, 2005, and 2nd Edition 2013); and he has authored ten guidebook titles about the Asian region (2005–2007).

In the summer of 2007 he worked in Hollywood as Production Designer, Art Director, and Director of Concept Design for the motion picture Red Velvet. He also did digital animation and 2nd unit direction (the alligator scene) for the film.

In 2010, Goss moved to Palm Springs, California where he opened a home studio/gallery, Swank Modern Design. Swank Modern's inaugural exhibition, The Sensual World, featured photographs by Goss shot in Thailand, Singapore, Sri Lanka and Cambodia.

Beginning is 2014, he published 18 large format portfolios of his photography from the preceding two decades: Observatory (Vol 1); Desert Modern (Vol 2); Find China (Vol 3); Mykonos (Vol 4); I, Japan (Vol 5); Thai Love Song (Vol 6); Wonder Walls (Vol 7); India: At First Sight (Vol 8); Tropical Regard II (Vol 9); Sri Lanka (Vol 10); My Penang (Vol 11); Offerings (Vol 12); Black Album (Vol 13); Singapore (Vol 14); Blossom World (Vol 15); Hawaii (Vol 16); Strange Fruit (Vol 17); and Full Spectrum (Vol 18).

In spring of 2019 he joined, and performs hula with, Kūhai Hālau O Kala'alohiikamakaokalaua'e Pā 'Ōlapa Kahiko under the guidance of kumu hula Carla Kala'alohiikamakaokalaua'e Culbertson, helping to perpetuate Hawaiian cultural heritage in the lineage of Frank Kawaikapuokalani Hewett as passed to him by 'Iolani Luahine, Edith Kanaka'ole, Emma DeFries, and Lani Kalama.

In spring, 2022, he was Production Designer for a new play by Joe Moe, Deny We Were, that premiered on May 11 at Wild Project in New York City. He also completed a two year graphic design packaging project for the Anthems & Antithets 4-disc collection of 88 new songs by Los Angeles composer, Brian Woodbury. That summer he performed with his hula hālau in Nā Pilina (Connections), a hula showcase, at the Palm Springs Cultural Center.

Personal life

In Sep, 2013, Goss married Amarin Ratanarat, his longtime partner since 1996.

In Feb, 2020, Goss confirmed his biological father, Grant Mitchell Salzman, through DNA testing and is also related to Harry Saltzman, producer of the early James Bond films.

Filmography

Performances

Selected bibliography
 'Kyoto Journal' #83, July 2015
 'The Greenwood Encyclopedia of LGBT Issues Worldwide' Vol 1 - 3, 2010, edited by Chuck Stewart. Advisory Board.
 'Sacred Asia', Fah Thai, Nov-Dec, 2006, pages 74–82
 'Irony and Dissembling: Queer Tactics for Experimental Documentary' by Kathleen McHugh, Between the Sheets, in the Streets: Queer, Lesbian, and Gay Documentary, 1997
 'Entropy, History, Space and Speeding Cars' by Erika Suderburg, Los Angeles, Editions Autrement, Paris, 1993
 'Life in the Media World' by Greg Schneider, Artweek, Volume 22, number 17, May 2, 1991, page 17
 'Youthful Persuasions: John Goss Speaks Out' by Gabriel Gomez, Afterimage. Nov 1990, page 9
 'John Goss: Forbidden Planet' by Lance Carlson, High Performance, Summer 1990, page 61
 'Performance Art as Political Activism' by Lance Carlson, Artweek Focus, May 3, 1990, page 23
 'Virtual Art, Virtual Fun' by Jan Breslauer, LA Weekly, Jul 21-Jul 27, 1989, page 39
 'Funhouse Explores Mortal Passageways' by Zan Dubin, Los Angeles Times, Calendar, Sun, July 9, 1989
 'October', number 43, Winter, 1987
 'The Sissy Boy, the Fat Ladies and the Dykes' by Alexander Doty, Camera Obscura, number 25-26, page 125
 'Wild Life: Collaborative Process and Gay Identity' by Gabriel Gomez, Jump Cut, number 37, pages 82–87
 'John Goss/John Greyson' by Jamitre Trott, New Art Examiner, Dec, 1987.

References

External links
 Siamorama, John Goss' personal website
 Swank Modern Design, John Goss' studio/gallery
 
 Sacred Asia, Fah Thai magazine

1958 births
Living people
Northern Illinois University alumni
University of California, San Diego alumni
American contemporary artists
Artists from California
American performance artists
American photographers
American LGBT photographers
American gay artists